The St. Thorlak Church is a religious building that is affiliated with the Catholic Church and is located in Kapúsínaklaustrið á Kollaleiru, in the town of Reyðarfjörður, Austurland (eastern region) in Iceland.

The St. Thorlak Church follows the Roman or Latin rite and is located within the Roman Catholic Diocese of Reykjavík (Dioecesis Reykiavikensis), the capital of Iceland.

The wooden bones of the church were built in Slovakia, then disassembled and shipped to Iceland. Local bishop (also from Slovakia) called for the help of volunteers in Hriňová. The church was built and then assembled in Reyðarfjörður by the help of volunteers and their donations of the material as well. Slovaks, Poles and others working in Iceland volunteered their weekends to construct the church in place.

Saint Thorlak
The church was dedicated to Torlak Torhallsson known in the church as Saint Thorlak (St. Þorlák), an Icelandic Catholic religious who founded the first Augustinian monastery in Iceland. His relics in the church of Skálholt were looted during the Protestant Reformation. His status as the patron saint of Iceland was recognized by Pope John Paul II in 1984 almost 800 years after his death.

See also
Roman Catholicism in Iceland

References

Roman Catholic churches in Iceland